Beaumaris is a rural locality in the local government area (LGA) of Break O'Day in the North-east LGA region of Tasmania. The 2016 census recorded a population of 289 for the state suburb of Beaumaris.

It is a small community on the north-east coast of Tasmania, facing the Tasman Sea. It is principally composed of beach-front properties, many of which are holiday or rental accommodation.

History 
Beaumaris was gazetted as a locality in 1967.
The area was named after the small Welsh town of Beaumaris.

Geography
The waters of the Tasman Sea form the eastern boundary, while the ridgeline of the Skyline Tier forms most of the western.

Road infrastructure 
Route A3 (Tasman Highway) runs through from south-east to north-east.

References

Towns in Tasmania
North East Tasmania
Localities of Break O'Day Council